Fábio Silva de Freitas (born 9 April 2002), commonly known as Fabinho, is a Brazilian professional footballer who plays as an midfielder for Palmeiras.

Career statistics

Club

Honours
Palmeiras
Copa Libertadores: 2021

References

2002 births
Living people
People from Natal, Rio Grande do Norte
Brazilian footballers
Brazil youth international footballers
Association football midfielders
Campeonato Brasileiro Série A players
Sociedade Esportiva Palmeiras players
Sportspeople from Rio Grande do Norte